The Law of Nature may refer to:

The Law of Nature (1916), a Lincoln Motion Picture Company film
The Law of Nature (1919), an Arrow Film Corporation production
Natural Law